Vrijhoeve-Capelle is a village in the Dutch province of North Brabant. It is located in the municipality of Waalwijk, about 10 km north of Tilburg.

History 
The village was first mentioned in 1523 as "ter Capelle in die Vrie Houven", and means "piece of land free of taxation near Capelle". Vrijhoeve-Capelle developed in the Middle Ages near the peat excavation area on the border of Holland and the Duchy of Brabant.

Huis Zuidewijn is a former estate. The central part and the left wing date from the late-16th century. The right wing was added in the 17th century. The estate was modified and extended in 1763.

Vrijhoeve-Capelle was home to 444 people in 1840. In 1886, a railway station was built on the Lage Zwaluwe to 's Hertogenbosch railway line. It closed in 1950 and the building was demolished the same year. Vrijhoeve-Capelle was a separate municipality until 1923, when it became part of Sprang-Capelle. In 1997, it became part of the municipality of Waalwijk.

Gallery

References

Populated places in North Brabant
Former municipalities of North Brabant
Waalwijk